Karl Heinrich Heydenreich (19 February 1764 – 26 April 1801) was a German philosopher and poet.

Heydenreich was born in Stolpen and was educated at the Thomasschule zu Leipzig and the University of Leipzig. In 1787 he became professor of philosophy at Leipzig. Writing works on Spinoza in the late 1780s, he became increasingly influenced by Immanuel Kant: his Betrachtungen (1790-1)  was "the first real example of a Kantian philosophical theology". Forced to give up his professorship in 1797, he died unsalaried in Burgwerben.

Works
Über Mendelssohns Darstellung der Spinozismus, 1787
Natur und Gott nach Spinoza, 1789
System der Ästhetik, 1790
Betrachtungen über die Philosophie der natürlichen Religion, 2 vols., 1790-1
System des Naturrechts nach kritischen Prinzipien, 1794-5
Briefe über den Atheismus, 1796
Grundsätze der Kritik der Lächerlichen mit Hinsicht auf das Lustpiel, 1797
Psychologische Entwickelung des Aberglaubens und der damit verknüpften Schwärmerey, 1798
Vesta. Keine Schriften zur Philosophie des Lebens, 5 vols., 1798-1801

References

1764 births
1801 deaths
18th-century German poets
German male poets
People educated at the St. Thomas School, Leipzig
Leipzig University alumni
18th-century German philosophers
18th-century German male writers